New York's 19th congressional district is located in New York's Catskills, Hudson Valley, Southern Tier, and Finger Lakes regions. It lies partially in the northernmost region of the New York metropolitan area and south of Albany. This district is currently represented by Republican Marc Molinaro. It was one of 18 districts that voted for Joe Biden in the 2020 presidential election while being won or held by a Republican in 2022.

Various New York districts have been numbered "19" over the years, including areas in New York City and various parts of upstate New York. The 19th District was a Manhattan-based district until 1980. It then was the Bronx-Westchester seat now numbered the 17th District. The present 19th District was the 21st District before the 1990s, and before that was the 25th District. 

The 2020 redistricting saw the district expand to include the entirety of Broome, Tioga, Chenango, Delaware, Greene, Sullivan, and Columbia Counties, while partially including Ulster and Otsego Counties.

Voting 

Results Under Current Lines (Since 2023)

History
 1873–1875 Montgomery
 1913–1983 Parts of Manhattan
 1983–1993 Parts of Bronx, Westchester
 1993–2003

2003–2013 

From 2003 to 2013, the 19th was composed of parts of Dutchess, Orange, Rockland, and Westchester Counties, in addition to the entirety of Putnam County. Much of this district is now the 18th district, while the current 19th is essentially a merger of the former 20th district and 22nd district.

2013–2023 

 

After redistricting in 2012, the 19th district comprised all of Columbia, Delaware, Greene, Otsego, Schoharie, Sullivan, and Ulster Counties; and parts of Broome, Dutchess, Montgomery, and Rensselaer Counties. The district borders Vermont, Massachusetts, and Connecticut to the east; and Pennsylvania to the southwest. Democratic President Barack Obama won the new district by 6.2% in 2012, while Republican Donald Trump won the district by 6.8% in 2016.

Incumbent Representative Nan Hayworth opted to follow most of her constituents into the new 18th district in 2012, but she was defeated by Democrat Sean Patrick Maloney, a former advisor to President Bill Clinton. Most of the 2003-13 19th district became part of the 2013-23 18th district. Meanwhile, incumbent 20th district representative Chris Gibson ran for re-election in the new 19th district and won. On January 5, 2015, per his pledge when elected not to serve more than 4 terms, Gibson announced that he would not run for re-election in 2016.

In 2016, Democrat Zephyr Teachout was defeated by Republican John Faso in the election. In 2018, Faso was defeated after only 1 term by Democrat Antonio Delgado. In 2022, Delgado resigned to become Lieutenant Governor, leaving the seat vacant. Democrat Pat Ryan won the special election to complete Delgado's term on August 23, 2022.

2023–present

Ryan ran in the 18th district in the November 2022 general election due to redistricting, while Democrat Josh Riley, who ran in the Democratic primary, lost to Republican Marc Molinaro in the 19th district.

List of members representing the district

Election results 

Note that in New York State electoral politics there are numerous minor parties at various points on the political spectrum. Certain parties will endorse either the Republican or Democratic candidate for every office, hence the state electoral results contain both the party votes, and the final candidate votes (Listed as "Recap").

See also

List of United States congressional districts
New York's congressional districts
United States congressional delegations from New York
United States House of Representatives elections in New York, 2018

Notes

References 

 Congressional Biographical Directory of the United States 1774–present
 2004 House election data Clerk of the House of Representatives
 2002 House election data "
 2000 House election data "
 1998 House election data "
 1996 House election data "

19
Constituencies established in 1813
1813 establishments in New York (state)